Hessville may refer to:

 Hessville, Indiana, a neighborhood in Hammond, Indiana
 Hessville, New York, a hamlet in Montgomery County, New York
 Hessville, Ohio, an unincorporated community in Sandusky County, New York